Love at First Sight is a 1932 German comedy film directed by Carl Froelich and starring Carl Jöken, Lee Parry and Lico Suhrmann.

The film's sets were designed by the art director Franz Schroedter.

Cast
Carl Jöken as Rudolf Niemeyer
Lee Parry as Hilde, wife
Lico Suhrmann as Siegfried, their son
Lizzi Waldmüller as Elisabeth, Duchess von Liebenstein
Adele Sandrock as the Duchess's aunt
Johannes Riemann as Prince Bernhard von Hassenstein
Hans Leibelt as Count Prillwitz, director
Arthur Mainzer as Prime Minister
Karl Etlinger as Wartenberg, theater agent
Rudolf Platte as Crammberg, Prince's adjutant
Hugo Froelich as hotel doorman
Lotte Holz as Elsa von Brabant

See also
Love at first sight

References

External links

1932 comedy films
German comedy films
Films of the Weimar Republic
Films directed by Carl Froelich
German black-and-white films
1930s German films